Deramas is a genus of butterflies in the family Lycaenidae erected by William Lucas Distant in 1886. The genus ranges from south Myanmar to Sundaland, the Philippines and Sulawesi.

Species
Deramas alixae Eliot, 1978
Deramas antynax Eliot, 1970
Deramas anyx Eliot, 1964
Deramas arshadorum Eliot, 1986
Deramas basrii Eliot, 1992
Deramas bidotata (Fruhstorfer, 1914)
Deramas cham Saito & Seki, 2006
Deramas evelynae Schröder & Treadaway, 1978
Deramas ikedai H. Hayashi, 1978
Deramas jasoda (de Nicéville, [1889])
Deramas livens Distant, 1886
Deramas manobo Schröder & Treadaway, 1978
Deramas masae Kawai, 1994
Deramas mindanensis Eliot, 1964
Deramas montana Schröder & Treadaway, 1978
Deramas nanae Osada, 1994
Deramas nelvis Eliot, 1964
Deramas nigrescens Eliot, 1964
Deramas nolens Eliot, 1964
Deramas osamui Hayashi & Ohtsuka, 1985
Deramas sumikat Schröder & Treadaway, 1986
Deramas suwartinae Osada, 1987
Deramas talophi H. Hayashi, Schröder & Treadaway, 1984
Deramas tomokoae H. Hayashi, 1978
Deramas toshikoae H. Hayashi, 1981
Deramas treadawayi H. Hayashi, 1981
Deramas woolletti Eliot, 1970

References
 Seitz, A., 1924-1927: In The Macrolepidoptera of the World, 9: 903-1026. Stuttgart.
 Eliot J.N., 1992: In Corbet & Pendlebury. The Butterflies of the Malay Peninsula, 4th edn. x+595pp, 69pls. Kuala Lumpur.
 Treadaway, Colin G., 1995: Checklist of the Butterflies of the Philippine Islands. Nachrichten des Entomologischen Vereins Apollo, Suppl. 14: 7-118.
 Seki, Y., Takanami, Y. & Otsuka K., 1991: Butterflies of Borneo, Lycaenidae. 2 (1): 1-113. Toboshima Corporation. Tokyo.
 Treadaway, Colin G. & Schrőder,Heinz,2012: Revised checklist of the butterflies of the Philippine Islands. Nachrichten des Entomologischen Vereins Apollo, Suppl. 20: 1-64.

External links
"Deramas Distant 1886". Tree of Life Web Project. Retrieved January 13, 2020.

 
Lycaenidae genera
Taxa named by William Lucas Distant
Poritiinae